The Botswana Power Corporation Workers' Union (BPCWU) is a trade union affiliate of the Botswana Federation of Trade Unions in Botswana.

See also

 Botswana Power Corporation

References

Botswana Federation of Trade Unions
Organisations based in Palapye
Trade unions in Botswana